José Naya (25 July 1896 – 29 January 1977) was an Uruguayan footballer who played as a forward. He was part of the Uruguayan team which won a gold medal at the 1924 Olympics.

References

External links
 profile

1896 births
1977 deaths
Uruguayan footballers
Footballers at the 1924 Summer Olympics
Olympic footballers of Uruguay
Olympic gold medalists for Uruguay
Uruguay international footballers
Liverpool F.C. (Montevideo) players
Olympic medalists in football
Copa América-winning players
Medalists at the 1924 Summer Olympics
Association football forwards